Exaeretia relegata is a moth in the family Depressariidae. It was described by Edward Meyrick in 1920. It is found on the Juan Fernandez Islands.

References

Moths described in 1920
Exaeretia
Moths of South America